The territory currently known as the United Arab Emirates was formerly populated by inhabitants of a number of coastal and inland settlements, with human remains pointing to a pattern of transmigration and settlement as far back as 125,000 years. Prehistoric settlement in the UAE took place in the Neolithic, with a number of distinctive eras of ancient settlement including the Stone Age Arabian Bifacial and Ubaid cultures from 5000 to 3100 BCE; the Hafit period with its distinctive beehive shaped tombs and Jemdet Nasr pottery, from 3200 to 2600 BCE; the Umm Al-Nar period from 2600 to 2000 BCE; the Wadi Suq Culture from 2000–1300 BCE and the three Iron Ages of the UAE.

Iron Age I spanned 1200–1000 BCE; Iron Age II from 1000–600 BCE and Iron Age III from 600–300 BCE. This was followed by the Hellenistic Mleiha era, from 300 BCE onwards through to the Islamic era which commenced with the culmination of the 7th century Ridda Wars.

The remains of settlements, burials and other extensive evidence of human habitation throughout these eras is littered throughout the UAE, with many extensive finds of rich materials in the shape of pottery, jewellery, weapons and both human and animal remains providing archaeologists and researchers with an increasingly sophisticated picture of longstanding involvement in regional trade alongside nomadic cultures eking out a living from the frequently arid and inhospitable desert and mountain environment of the UAE.

Settlements

See also 
 List of cultural property of national significance in the United Arab Emirates
 List of cities of the ancient Near East

References 

United Arab Emirates history-related lists